Erasmus Albertus Jansen van Vuuren (born 23 May 1985) is a South African rugby union player, whose usual position is prop or hooker.

After representing the Pumas at the Under-18 Craven Week in 2003, he joined the  Academy, playing for them at Under-20 and Under-21 level in 2004 and 2005. He had a short spell at French Rugby Pro D2 side Gaillac during their 2006–07 season before returning to the Golden Lions. After making 70 appearances in three seasons for Aurillac, he joined Top 14 side  prior to the 2011–12 Top 14 season. He spent two seasons in Montpellier before joining  in the 2013–14 Rugby Pro D2 season. He helped them win promotion in his first season at the club and avoid relegation in the 2014–15 Top 14 season. He once again dropped into the Pro D2 for 2015–16, joining . After one season there, he returned to South Africa to join  the Pumas for the 2016 Currie Cup.

References

External links

1985 births
Living people
South African rugby union players
Montpellier Hérault Rugby players
Blue Bulls players
Golden Lions players
Pumas (Currie Cup) players
Rugby union hookers